Here are the squads for the 1960 European Nations' Cup in France, which took place from 6 to 10 July 1960.

Czechoslovakia
Manager: Rudolf Vytlačil

France
Manager: Albert Batteux

Soviet Union
Manager: Gavriil Kachalin

Yugoslavia
Managers: Ljubomir Lovrić, Dragomir Nikolić and Aleksandar Tirnanić

External links
1960 European Nations' Cup squads at RSSSF.com
Czechoslovakia–France on the French Football Federation
Czechoslovakia–Soviet Union on the Football Association of the Czech Republic website
Czechoslovakia–France on the Football Association of the Czech Republic website

1960
Squads